In seven-dimensional geometry, a rectified 7-cube is a convex uniform 7-polytope, being a rectification of the regular 7-cube.

There are unique 7 degrees of rectifications, the zeroth being the 7-cube, and the 6th and last being the 7-cube. Vertices of the rectified 7-cube are located at the edge-centers of the 7-ocube. Vertices of the birectified 7-cube are located in the square face centers of the 7-cube. Vertices of the trirectified 7-cube are located in the cube cell centers of the 7-cube.

Rectified 7-cube

Alternate names
 rectified hepteract (Acronym rasa) (Jonathan Bowers)

Images

Cartesian coordinates 
Cartesian coordinates for the vertices of a rectified 7-cube, centered at the origin, edge length  are all permutations of:
 (±1,±1,±1,±1,±1,±1,0)

Birectified 7-cube

Alternate names
 Birectified hepteract (Acronym bersa) (Jonathan Bowers)

Images

Cartesian coordinates 
Cartesian coordinates for the vertices of a birectified 7-cube, centered at the origin, edge length  are all permutations of:
 (±1,±1,±1,±1,±1,0,0)

Trirectified 7-cube

Alternate names
 Trirectified hepteract
 Trirectified 7-orthoplex
 Trirectified heptacross (Acronym sez) (Jonathan Bowers)

Images

Cartesian coordinates 
Cartesian coordinates for the vertices of a trirectified 7-cube, centered at the origin, edge length  are all permutations of:
 (±1,±1,±1,±1,0,0,0)

Related polytopes

Notes

References
 H.S.M. Coxeter: 
 H.S.M. Coxeter, Regular Polytopes, 3rd Edition, Dover New York, 1973 
 Kaleidoscopes: Selected Writings of H.S.M. Coxeter, edited by F. Arthur Sherk, Peter McMullen, Anthony C. Thompson, Asia Ivic Weiss, Wiley-Interscience Publication, 1995,  
 (Paper 22) H.S.M. Coxeter, Regular and Semi Regular Polytopes I, [Math. Zeit. 46 (1940) 380-407, MR 2,10]
 (Paper 23) H.S.M. Coxeter, Regular and Semi-Regular Polytopes II, [Math. Zeit. 188 (1985) 559-591]
 (Paper 24) H.S.M. Coxeter, Regular and Semi-Regular Polytopes III, [Math. Zeit. 200 (1988) 3-45]
 Norman Johnson Uniform Polytopes, Manuscript (1991)
 N.W. Johnson: The Theory of Uniform Polytopes and Honeycombs, Ph.D. 
  o3o3o3x3o3o4o - sez, o3o3o3o3x3o4o - bersa, o3o3o3o3o3x4o - rasa

External links 
 Polytopes of Various Dimensions
 Multi-dimensional Glossary

7-polytopes